Bouvardia is a genus of flowering plants in the family Rubiaceae. It contains about 50 species of evergreen herbs and shrubs native to Mexico and Central America, with one species extending into the southwestern United States (B. ternifolia, in Arizona, New Mexico and Texas). The genus is named in honor of Charles Bouvard (1572–1658), physician to Louis XIII, and superintendent of the Jardin du Roi in Paris.

In the language of flowers, Bouvardia symbolize enthusiasm.

Description
They grow to 0.6–1.5 m tall. The leaves are opposite or in whorls of 3-5, ovate to lanceolate, 3–11 cm long. The flowers are in terminal, generally many-flowered clusters; the corolla has a large tube and four spreading lobes; flower colour ranges varies between species, with white, yellow, pink, and red all found.

Uses
Several species of Bouvardia are grown as ornamental plants, both in the tropics and indoors as houseplants in temperate regions. Several cultivars and hybrids have been selected. When grown as houseplants, a minimum winter temperature of 7 °C is required, with a minimum of 12 °C while in flower. Propagation of the cultivars is by cuttings taken in late spring or summer, which need to be kept at a temperature of 20 °C by night and 25 °C during the day, and shaded when required.

Species

 Bouvardia amplexicaulis Borhidi & E.Martinez
 Bouvardia borhidiana Lozada-Pérez
 Bouvardia bouvardioides (Seem.) Standl.
 Bouvardia candidissima Borhidi & E.Martinez
 Bouvardia capitata Bullock
 Bouvardia castilloi Borhidi & Garcia Gonz.
 Bouvardia chrysantha Mart.
 Bouvardia conzattii Greenm.
 Bouvardia cordifolia DC.
 Bouvardia costaricensis C.M.Taylor
 Bouvardia dictyoneura Standl.
 Bouvardia elegans Borhidi
 Bouvardia erecta DC.
 Bouvardia ferruginea Borhidi
 Bouvardia glabra Polak
 Bouvardia gracilipes B.L.Rob.
 Bouvardia hernan-maganae Borhidi & Serrano-Card.
 Bouvardia hintoniorum B.L.Turner
 Bouvardia karwinskyi Standl.
 Bouvardia keniae Borhidi & Saynes
 Bouvardia laevis M.Martens & Galeotti
 Bouvardia langlassei Standl.
 Bouvardia latifolia Standl.
 Bouvardia leiantha Benth.
 Bouvardia loeseneriana Standl.
 Bouvardia longiflora (Cav.) Kunth
 Bouvardia lottiae Borhidi
 Bouvardia mitlensis Borhidi & Salas-Mor.
 Bouvardia multiflora (Cav.) Schult. & Schult.f.
 Bouvardia oaxacana Standl.
 Bouvardia obovata Kunth
 Bouvardia pallida Standl.
 Bouvardia pascualii Borhidi
 Bouvardia pedicellaris Borhidi 
 Bouvardia pulverulenta Borhidi  & Salas-Mor.
 Bouvardia pungens Borhidi 
 Bouvardia quinquenervata Standl.
 Bouvardia rekoi Standl.
 Bouvardia rosea Schltdl.
 Bouvardia rosei Standl.
 Bouvardia rzedowskii Terrell & S.D.Koch
 Bouvardia sancaroli Borhidi & M.Martinez
 Bouvardia scabra Hook. & Arn.
 Bouvardia standleyana W.H.Blackw.
 Bouvardia stenosiphon Borhidi  & Salas-Mor.
 Bouvardia subcordata Standl.
 Bouvardia tenuifolia Standl.
 Bouvardia ternifolia (Cav.) Schltdl.
 Bouvardia tubicalyx Borhidi  & Salas-Mor.
 Bouvardia viminalis Schltdl.
 Bouvardia xestosperma (B.L.Rob. & Greenm.) Terrell & S.D.Koch
 Bouvardia xylosteoides Hook. & Arn.

References

External links 

 Bouvardia in the World Checklist of Rubiaceae

Rubiaceae genera
Spermacoceae
Flora of Central America